Pseudometachilo irrectellus is a moth in the family Crambidae. It was described by Heinrich Benno Möschler in 1882. It is found in French Guiana, Suriname and Paraná, Brazil.

References

Moths described in 1882